The El Pilar mine is a large proposed copper mine in Sonora, Mexico. El Pilar is one of the largest copper reserves in Mexico and the world having estimated reserves of 685.8 million tonnes of ore grading 0.28% copper. As of 2021, the mine is planned to produce 36,000 tonnes a year starting in 2023.

See also
 El Arco mine
 Buenavista mine

References 

Copper mines in Mexico